Vladas Turla (born 22 February 1953) is a Lithuanian former sport shooter who competed for the Soviet Union in the 1980 Summer Olympics and finished 4th.

Records

References

1953 births
Living people
Soviet male sport shooters
Lithuanian male sport shooters
ISSF pistol shooters
Olympic shooters of the Soviet Union
Shooters at the 1980 Summer Olympics
Vilnius Gediminas Technical University alumni
People from Biržai
Lithuanian Sportsperson of the Year winners